Cal Tjader Plays the Contemporary Music of Mexico and Brazil is a 1962 studio album by Cal Tjader.

Track listing 
 "Vai Querer" (Laurindo Almeida, Fernando Lobo) – 3:03
 "Qué Tristeza" (Mario Ruiz Armengol) – 2:51
 "Meditação (Meditation)" (Newton Mendonça, Antonio Carlos Jobim, Norman Gimbel) – 3:32
 "Soñé" (Armengol) – 3:09
 "Se é Tarde, Me Perdoa" (Ronaldo Bôscoli, Carlos Lyra) – 2:48
 "Não Diga Nada" (Carlita, Noacy Mercenes) – 2:50
 "Silenciosa" (Armengol) – 3:28
 "Elizete" (Clare Fischer) – 2:30
 "Imagen" (Armengol) – 2:40
 "Tentaço do Incoveniente" (Manoel Da Conceição, Augusto Mesquita) – 2:33
 "Preciosa" (Armengol) – 2:42
 "Chôro e Batuque" (Almeida) – 5:02

Personnel 
 Freddie Schreiber - double bass
 Changuito - conga
 Laurindo Almeida - guitar
 Johnny Rae - percussion, drums, timbales
 Milt Holland - percussion
 Clare Fischer - piano, arranger
 Gene Cipriano - woodwind
 Bernard Fleischer
 Paul Horn
 John Lowe
 Don Shelton
 Cal Tjader - vibraphone
 Ardeen DeCamp - vocals

References 

1962 albums
Albums arranged by Clare Fischer
Cal Tjader albums
Verve Records albums
Albums produced by Creed Taylor